

Events

February events
 February 22 – Passenger service begins on Strasburg Rail Road with a visit from Abraham Lincoln.

April events
 April 1 – Budapest Déli station opens as the Buda terminal of the line to Fiume.
 April – Nathaniel Marsh succeeds Samuel Marsh as president of the Erie Railroad.

May events
 May 13 – Line opened between Karachi and Kochi on 5 ft 6in (1676 mm) gauge, the first railway in modern-day Pakistan.

 May 24 – The Great Train Raid of 1861 is conducted by Stonewall Jackson.

June events
 June 16 – Battle of Vienna, Virginia, is the first time in history a railroad is used tactically in battle.
Regular services to Paraguarí begin on September 21 and on December 25 the line is extended to the city of Luque.

July events
 July 21 – Railroad transport of Confederate States of America troops delivers decisive reinforcements providing victory in the First Battle of Bull Run.

August events 
 August 6 – An Act is passed to authorize the construction of the Blane Valley Railway in Scotland.

September events 
 September 4 – The Staten Island Railway is placed into receivership with William Henry Vanderbilt as receiver.

December events

Unknown date events

 Jean-Jacques Meyer patents the Meyer locomotive.
 Jackson and Woodin Manufacturing Company in Berwick, Pennsylvania, later to become part of American Car and Foundry, begins manufacturing railroad infrastructure parts.

Accidents

Births

January births 
 January 28 – Daniel Willard, president of Baltimore and Ohio Railroad 1910–1941 (d. 1942).

April births 
 April 26 – Zhan Tianyou, Chief Engineer responsible for construction of the Imperial Peking-Kalgan Railway, the first railway constructed in China without foreign assistance (d. 1919).

June births
 June 8 – Karl Gölsdorf, Austrian steam locomotive designer (d. 1916).

November births 
 November 2 - Oliver Robert Hawke Bury, Chief mechanical engineer and manager of Great Western Railway of Brazil 1892–1894, general manager of the Great Northern Railway in England 1902–1912, Director of the London and North Eastern Railway 1912–1945 (d. 1946).

Deaths

October deaths
 October 13 – Sir William Cubitt, civil engineer on the South Eastern and Great Northern Railways of England (d. 1861).

References
 (January 16, 2005), Biographies of chairmen, managers & other senior officers. Retrieved February 10, 2005.